Taylor Price (born October 8, 1987) is a former American football wide receiver. He was drafted by the New England Patriots in the third round of the 2010 NFL Draft. He played college football at Ohio University. He also played for the Jacksonville Jaguars and Seattle Seahawks.

Early years
Price was born in Hilliard, Ohio, and attended Hilliard Darby High School. As a junior, he was a second-team all-conference selection and as a senior he was an honorable mention all-district selection. He played in all three phases of the game, and blocked five kicks on special teams as a junior.  He also lettered in baseball.

College career
Price attended Ohio University and played in 14 games as a true freshman in 2006, finishing the year with nine receptions for 77 yards. As a sophomore, Price started at wide receiver and recorded 33 receptions for 464 yards and four touchdowns. He also had six rushes for 23 yards and two passes for 50 yards and a touchdown. In 2008 as a junior, Price started 11 of 12 games made 51 catches for 694 yards and five touchdowns. He also rushed five times for 19 yards and had two kickoff returns for 22 yards. In his senior season in 2009, Price started all 14 games and set a career-high with 56 receptions for 784 yards, and also carried the ball 11 times for 103 yards. His 149 career receptions set an Ohio record, while his 2,019 receiving yards ranked second in school history. Price also had a 14-catch performance against Wyoming, a school record.

Statistics

~includes bowl games

Professional career

Pre-draft

New England Patriots
Price was drafted by the New England Patriots in the third round (90th overall) of the 2010 NFL Draft. On May 25, 2010, he signed a four-year deal with the Patriots. Price was inactive for the first 15 games of his rookie regular season before making his NFL debut in the Week 17 finale against the Miami Dolphins. He caught three passes for 41 yards in the game. Price was waived by the Patriots on December 3, 2011, after playing in only three games in 2011.

Jacksonville Jaguars
The Jacksonville Jaguars claimed Price off waivers on December 5, 2011.  The Tampa Bay Buccaneers had also put in a claim for Price, but he went to the Jaguars because they were higher on the waiver order.

Price was waived/injured on August 12, 2012, and subsequently reverted to injured reserve on August 18.

Price was once again waived/injured on August 5, 2013 and placed on injured reserve on August 7

Seattle Seahawks

Seattle signed Price to a one-year contract on March 12, 2014. He was placed on injured reserve on July 29, 2014.

References

External links
Jacksonville Jaguars bio
New England Patriots bio
Ohio Bobcats bio

1987 births
Living people
People from Hilliard, Ohio
Players of American football from Ohio
American football wide receivers
Ohio Bobcats football players
New England Patriots players
Jacksonville Jaguars players
Seattle Seahawks players